Edmund Waller, FRS (3 March 1606 – 21 October 1687) was an English poet and politician who was Member of Parliament for various constituencies between 1624 and 1687, and one of the longest serving members of the English House of Commons.

Son of a wealthy lawyer with extensive estates in Buckinghamshire, Waller first entered Parliament in 1624, although he played little part in the political struggles of the period prior to the First English Civil War in 1642. Unlike his relatives William and Hardress Waller, he was Royalist in sympathy and was accused in 1643 of organising a plot to seize London for Charles I. He allegedly escaped the death penalty by paying a large bribe, while several conspirators were executed, including his brother-in-law Nathaniel Tomkins.

After his sentence was commuted to banishment, he lived in comfortable exile in France and Switzerland until allowed home in 1651 by Oliver Cromwell, a distant relative. He returned to Parliament after The Restoration in 1660 of Charles II; known as a fine and amusing orator, he held a number of minor offices. He largely retired from active politics after the death of his second wife in 1677, and died of edema in October 1687.

Best remembered now for his poem "Song (Go, lovely rose)", Waller's earliest writing dates to the late 1630s, commemorating events that occurred in the 1620s, including a piece on Charles's escape from a shipwreck at Santander in 1625. Written in heroic couplets, it is one of the first examples of a form used by English poets for some two centuries; his verse was admired by John Dryden among others, while he was a close friend of Thomas Hobbes and John Evelyn.

When he died, Waller was considered a major English poet, but his reputation declined over the next century, one view seeing him as a 'fairweather Royalist, an expedient Republican and mercenary bridegroom'. He is now regarded as a minor author, whose primary significance was to develop a form adapted and improved by later poets like Alexander Pope.

Personal details

Edmund Waller was born on 3 March 1606 at Stocks Place, Coleshill, Buckinghamshire, eldest son of Robert Waller (1560–1616) and Anne Hampden (1589–1658). He came from a family of 15, many of whom survived to adulthood, including Elizabeth (1601–?), Anne (1602–1642), Cecilia (1603–?), Robert (1606–1641), Mary (1608–1660), Ursula (1610–1692) and John (1616–1667). Cecilia married Nathaniel Tomkins, executed for his part in the 1643 plot, while Mary married Adrian Scrope, executed in 1660 as a regicide.

In addition, Waller was related to several prominent Parliamentarians; through his mother, he was distantly connected to Oliver Cromwell, while he and John Hampden were grandchildren of Griffith Hampden (1543–1591). On his father's side, he was related to the Parliamentarian generals Sir Hardress and Sir William Waller.

In 1631, he married Anne Banks, orphaned heiress of a wealthy merchant; contracted in defiance of the Privy Council of England, the marriage was eventually approved by Charles I. Anne died in childbirth in 1634, leaving two children, Robert (1633–1652?) and Elizabeth (1634–1653).

In 1644, he re-married, this time to Mary Bracey (died 1677) and they had numerous children; since their eldest son Benjamin was mentally disabled, he was succeeded by Edmund (1652–1700), MP for Amersham from 1689 to 1698. His youngest son Stephen (1676–1708) was one of the Commissioners who negotiated the 1707 Treaty of Union. On his death, his estate was valued at the then considerable sum of £40,000; he left legacies to his children Margaret (1648–1690), who acted as his secretary and Benjamin's guardian, Mary, Elizabeth, Anne, Cicely, Octavia, Dorothy and William.

Career

Waller attended Royal Grammar School, High Wycombe, followed by Eton and King's College, Cambridge. He left without a degree, and as was common in this period did a course in law at Lincoln's Inn, graduating in 1622. He was first elected in 1624 as MP for Ilchester, when he was the youngest person in the Commons, then for Chepping Wycombe in 1626. On coming of age in 1627, he inherited an estate worth up to £2,500 a year, making him one of the wealthiest men in Buckinghamshire.

Returned for Amersham in 1628, he made virtually no impact on Parliament before it was dissolved in 1629, when Charles I instituted eleven years of Personal Rule. During this period, he became friends with George Morley, later Bishop of Worcester, who guided his reading and provided advice on writing, while Waller apparently paid his debts. Morley also introduced Waller to Lucius Cary, 2nd Viscount Falkland; he became a member of the Great Tew Circle, which included Edward Hyde, and was greatly influenced by Falkland's moderation and tolerance.

Nineteenth century biographers dated his earliest work to the 1620s, largely because they commemorate events occurring in that period, but modern scholars suggest they were actually written in the mid to late 1630s in an attempt to build a career at court. As well as Charles himself, many of his works are addressed to members of the extended Percy family, such as the Countess of Carlisle, the Countess of Sunderland  and the Earl of Northumberland. Hyde recorded Waller became a poet at the age of thirty, "when other Men give over writing Verses". 

When Charles recalled Parliament in April 1640 to approve taxes for the Bishops' Wars, Waller was re-elected for Amersham, then for St Ives in November. Despite general consensus attempts by Charles to govern without Parliament had gone too far, moderates like Hyde and Falkland were also wary of changing the balance too much the other way. John Pym, who headed the Parliamentary opposition to Charles, gave Waller responsibility for the impeachment of Sir Francis Crawley, one of the Ship Money judges, but he confirmed his Royalist sympathies by voting against the execution of Strafford in April 1641, and the removal of bishops from the House of Lords.

Unlike Hyde and Falkland who joined the king when the First English Civil War began in August 1642, Waller remained in London, apparently with Charles' permission, where he continued to support moderates like Denzil Holles who wanted a negotiated peace. In May 1643 a plot was uncovered, allegedly organised by Waller along with his brother-in-law Nathaniel Tomkins, and wealthy merchant Richard Chaloner; what apparently began as a plan to force Parliament into negotiations by withholding taxes turned into an armed conspiracy intended to allow the Royalist army to take control of London.

After Waller was arrested, he made a full confession, implicating a number of his co-conspirators; he escaped the death penalty, allegedly by paying bribes, while Chaloner and Tomkins were executed on 5 July 1643. Many moderates were forced to disavow support for a peace settlement to avoid suspicion of involvement and reaffirm their backing for military action. After spending 18 months in prison without trial, Waller was fined £10,000 and permitted to go into exile in November 1644, accompanied by his new wife Mary; however, the affair caused lasting damage to his reputation.

Waller travelled with John Evelyn in Switzerland and Italy; unlike many Royalists, he lived in some comfort using money sent to him by his mother. Probably with the support of his relations Cromwell and Scrope, the Rump Parliament allowed him to return home in January 1652. He established good relations with Cromwell, writing him a 'Panegyrick' in 1655, and later supporting proposals to make him king; in a poem written after the capture of the Spanish treasure fleet in 1658, he suggested "let the rich ore be forthwith melted down, and the state fixed by making him a crown'.

When Charles II returned to the throne after The Restoration, Waller commemorated the occasion with his 1660 poem To the King, upon his Majesty's Happy Return. Reconciling past support for the Commonwealth with the restored monarchy was a problem faced by many, but in his 1779 biography Samuel Johnson wrote it showed that "a prostituted mind may retain the glitter of wit, but has lost the dignity of virtue". In 1661, he was elected to the Cavalier Parliament as MP for Hastings; he became a Fellow of the Royal Society in 1663, although does not appear to have contributed papers himself. He played a prominent role in the impeachment and exile of Clarendon in 1667, and thereafter held a number of positions under the Cabal ministry.

Originally viewed as a supporter of the Court, after 1674 he gained a reputation for independence and was still regarded as one of the best speakers in the Commons. Generally an advocate of religious tolerance, especially for Protestant Nonconformists, he was however convinced of the truth of the Popish Plot in 1678 and withdrew from active politics during the 1679 to 1681 Exclusion Crisis. On the accession of James II, he was elected for Saltash in 1685.

He wrote two poems to the new king, urging reconciliation and national unity, but James suspended Parliament in November after it refused to pass his Declaration of Indulgence. Waller died at his London house in St James's on 21 October 1687, and was buried in the churchyard of St Mary and All Saints Church, Beaconsfield; his tomb is now grade II* listed.

Literary works and assessment

Waller was admired by contemporaries including John Dryden and Gerard Langbaine, although his extravagant praise for members of the court and Royal family was later parodied by Andrew Marvell in "Last Instructions to a Painter". Described by Francis Atterbury as "the Parent of English Verse", by the nineteenth century his work was out of favour. Edmund Gosse, author of his biography in the 1911 Encyclopædia Britannica, wrote: 'Waller's lyrics were at one time admired to excess, but with the exception of "Go, lovely Rose" and one or two others, they have greatly lost their charm'.

By 1995, the protagonist of The Information, a novel by Martin Amis, dismisses him as a 'seat-warmer, air sniffer and mediocrity'. However, H. M. Redmond argued 'immoderate censure of his life' had combined with 'interest-killing appreciation' of his verse to 'prevent a dispassionate assessment'. One suggestion is while his writing is limited, he played an important role in developing a format and style adapted and improved by Alexander Pope among others.

Much of his early poetry was written for the Caroline court, while he was famous for his 'Panegyricks', written in support of Cromwell, then both Charles II and his brother James, as well as other members of the Royal family. His longest and most ambitious work of this type portrayed the inconclusive 1665 Battle of Lowestoft;  presenting it as an heroic victory and heaping praise on James, it was widely ridiculed.

He was strongly influenced by Thomas Hobbes, whose Leviathan he admired, and whose De Cive he at one point proposed to translate. His early work was far more successful than later efforts and during his exile an unlicensed collection of his poems was published in 1645. Reprinted in 1664, 1668, 1682, and 1686, they were popular in part because they were easily set to music; two volumes of previously uncollected writings, "The Maid's Tragedy Altered" and "The Second Part of Mr Waller's Poems" were published after his death in 1690. They included Divine Poems, self-published by Waller in 1686; most critics view them as 'indifferent' and showing his decline as a writer.

Notes

References

Sources

Bibliography
  
 
 
 
 

 

1606 births
1687 deaths
17th-century English poets
17th-century male writers
Original Fellows of the Royal Society
People educated at Eton College
People educated at the Royal Grammar School, High Wycombe
People from Beaconsfield
People from Chiltern District
Members of the pre-1707 English Parliament for constituencies in Cornwall
English MPs 1624–1625
English MPs 1626
English MPs 1628–1629
English MPs 1640 (April)
English MPs 1640–1648
English MPs 1661–1679
English MPs 1685–1687
English male poets